The A448 is a main road in England running between Studley in Warwickshire and Kidderminster in Worcestershire.

Route

The A448 starts at a fork junction on the A435 just to the South of Studley, heading North West into the new town of Redditch, entering Worcestershire immediately before a roundabout where it meets the A441. For the next  it is concurrent with the A441, before diverging at England's only Cloverleaf interchange. From this point the A448 heads West on a dual carriageway bypassing the villages of Tardebigge and Finstall. The dual carriageway ends on a roundabout with the A38 Bromsgrove Bypass. It continues through the congested town centre and out of the other side, passing under the M5. It is now a twisty single carriageway road passing through several villages before entering Kidderminster. It crosses the A449 at traffic lights, and descends past Kidderminster station and Severn Valley Railway to meet the Ring Road.

Former routes

 Through Redditch the A448 used to follow now unclassified roads on the South Side of the new town, changes coming during the 1970s when new dual carriageways (or Highways) were built to deal with the rising volume of traffic following the town's growth.
 Between Redditch and Bromsgrove the villages of Tardebigge and Finstall have been bypassed
 The A448 used to be concurrent with the A38 along Bromsgrove High Street

Places of interest
 Severn Valley Railway
 Tardebigge Locks
 Lickey Incline

See also
British road numbering scheme

References

External links

SABRE: A448

Roads in England
Roads in Warwickshire
Roads in Worcestershire